Sideroxylon mirmulans, commonly known as marmulano, is a species of flowering plants in the family Sapotaceae. It is endemic to the Madeira Islands (Portugal). It is threatened by habitat loss.

Description

Distribution and habitat
The species is found on Madeira Island, Porto Santo Island and Desertas Islands. It is the dominant species in low coastal forests along the northern shore of Madeira from  elevation, and in pockets on the southern side of the island between 200 and 300 meters elevation. It is commonly found with the shrubs Maytenus umbellata and Globularia salicina.

Systematics
The former subspecies marginata from Cape Verde is now considered a separate species: Sideroxylon marginatum. Plants from the Canary Islands are now considered Sideroxylon canariense.

References

Further reading
 Árvores e Florestas de Portugal - Açores e Madeira ("Trees and Flowers of Portugal: the Azores and Madeira"), Edic. Público, Comunicações, SA. Dep. law no. 254481/2007
 Press, J.R., Short, M.J., 1994. "Flora of Madeira". HMSO. London

mirmulans
Flora of Madeira
Endemic flora of Madeira
Vulnerable plants
Taxonomy articles created by Polbot